Gazzo is a comune (municipality) in the Province of Padua in the Italian region Veneto, located about  northwest of Venice and about  northwest of Padua.

The municipality of Gazzo contains the frazioni (subdivisions, mainly villages and hamlets) Grossa, Gaianigo, Grantortino, and Villalta.

Gazzo borders the following municipalities: Camisano Vicentino, Grantorto, Grumolo delle Abbadesse, Piazzola sul Brenta, Quinto Vicentino, San Pietro in Gu, Torri di Quartesolo.

Demographic evolution

References

External links
 www.comune.gazzo.pd.it

Cities and towns in Veneto